Berruguete is an administrative neighborhood of Madrid belonging to the district of Tetuán.

Wards of Madrid
Tetuán (Madrid)